{{DISPLAYTITLE:C17H21NO4}}
The formula C17H21NO4 may refer to:

 Cocaine
 Cocaine reverse ester
 Fenoterol
 Hydromorphinol
 Hyoscine (scopolamine)
 Oxymorphol

Molecular formulas